Cochlorhinini is a tribe of leafhoppers in the subfamily Deltocephalinae. The tribe is endemic to the western United States and adjacent parts of Mexico, however at least one species (Cochlorhinus pluto) has been introduced to Chile. Cochlorhinini contains 11 genera and over 140 species.

Genera 
There are 11 described genera of Cochlorhinini:

 Allygianus Ball, 1936
 Allygiella Oman, 1949 
 Calonia Beamer, 1940
 Cochlorhinus Uhler, 1876
 Drionia Ball, 1915
 Eulonus Oman, 1949
 Gloridonus Ball, 1936 
 Huleria Ball, 1902
 Limbanus Oman, 1949  
 Pasadenus Ball, 1936  
 Penehuleria Beamer, 1934

References 

Cicadellidae